Lance Beddoes (born 3 November 1992 in Auckland, New Zealand) is a professional squash player who represents New Zealand. He attended Massey High School in West Auckland from 2006 to 2010. He reached a career-high world ranking of World No. 89 in November 2015. He has represented New Zealand in two Commonwealth Games, Glasgow in 2014 and Gold Coast 2018.

References

External links 

New Zealand male squash players
Living people
1992 births
Squash players at the 2014 Commonwealth Games
Squash players at the 2018 Commonwealth Games
Commonwealth Games competitors for New Zealand